Božena Angelova (born 1981 Maribor) is a Slovenian violinist. She has recorded for the Slovenian Broadcasting Company and has performed as a soloist with the Slovenian Philharmonic Orchestra and the Carinthian symphony orchestra, amongst others.

Biography 
She began playing the violin at age of seven, initially taught by her father. After finishing the local music school,  she moved to Austria in order to study with Helfried Fister at the Conservatory of Music in Klagenfurt where she obtained her music degree with distinction. She continued her musical studies at the College of Music and Arts in Bern, Switzerland and at the University of Music »Mozarteum« in Salzburg with Igor Ozim, where she finished her masterstudies with distinction.  To complement her university education, she attended many courses by renowned musicians, including Thomas Brandis, Tibor Varga, Evgenia Tchugaeva, Mintcho Mintchev, Rainer Schmidt, Siegmund Nissel, Emerson String Quartet, and Bruno Canino.

Angelova performed as soloist with orchestras including: the Carinthian symphony orchestra, Klagenfurt (Austria), Symphony orchestra of Maribor (Slovenia), and the Slovenian philharmonic orchestra in Ljubljana, as well as with the New chamber orchestra and the Ars academica orchestra in Spain and Germany.

She is guest artist in national and international music festivals:
Festival Bled (Slovenia), «Festival Ljubljana«,  Festival »Music September«in Maribor, Festival Internacional de Música Cásica de Peñíscola, Gewandhaus Leipzig, »Mozart's Wohnhaus Konzerte« in Salzburg, »Mozartfest-Schwetzingen« (Germany) and contemporary music performances in Spain with the Ensemble Zahir, as well as with the OENM (Austrian ensemble for contemporary music) in Vienna.

Angelova has collaborated with musicians as Mate Bekavac, Arvid Engegard, Radovan Vlatković, Milan Turković, Per Rundberg, Stefan Schilli, Joanna Kamenarska,  and recorded for the Slovenian and Austrian Broadcasting Companies.
She performs regularly as a soloist and chamber musician in Slovenia and abroad.

Awards 
During her studies Angelova competed in several international music competitions. She was awarded with many prizes and scholarships:
 prize at the Slovenian national music competition,
 several prizes at the International „Alpe-Adria“ competition in Italy,
 prize at the international Johannes Brahms competition in Austria,
 the Slovenian composer's award,
 arts-scholarship from the Swiss government and
 Scholarship from the Slovenian Ministry of Culture.

References 

Slovenian classical violinists
Musicians from Maribor
Living people
1981 births
21st-century classical violinists